Bethel Christian School was a private PreK-12 Christian school located in unincorporated Jefferson Davis Parish, Louisiana, near Jennings. As of 2012 the school had over 250 students in PreK-12. This includes the K3 and K4 preschool departments, which had over 35 students.

The school was established in 1993. At that time the school had 13 students and two teachers. The school began serving high school grades in 1999. On May 19, 2003 the school's first senior class, consisting of 10 students, conducted its graduation ceremony. 

The school ceased operation at the end of the 2013-14 school year.

References

External links

Bethel Christian School

1993 establishments in Louisiana
Christian schools in Louisiana
Educational institutions established in 1993
Private elementary schools in Louisiana
Private middle schools in Louisiana
Private high schools in Louisiana
Schools in Jefferson Davis Parish, Louisiana